The 2011 season was Ulisses's eleventh season in the Armenian Premier League. They finished the seasons as Champions of the Armenian Premier League and were knocked out of the Armenian Cup by Shirak in the Semifinals and by Ferencváros in the First qualifying round of the Europa League.

Squad

Transfers

In

Out

Released

Competitions

Premier League

Results summary

Results

Table

Armenian Cup

2011

2011–12

The Semifinal took place during the 2012–13 season.

UEFA Europa League

Qualifying rounds

Statistics

Appearances and goals

|-
|colspan="16"|Players away on loan:
|-
|colspan="16"|Players who left Ulisses during the season:

|}

Goal scorers

Clean sheets

Disciplinary Record

References

Ulisses FC
Ulisses
Ulisses